Reto Bolli (born 2 March 1979 Switzerland) is a Swiss former professional footballer.

External links

1979 births
Living people
Swiss men's footballers
Switzerland under-21 international footballers
Grasshopper Club Zürich players
FC Locarno players
AC Bellinzona players
FC Schaffhausen players
FC St. Gallen players
FC Aarau players
Swiss Challenge League players
Association football goalkeepers